Purav Raja and Ramkumar Ramanathan were the defending champions but only Ramanathan chose to defend his title, partnering Arjun Kadhe. Ramanathan lost in the quarterfinals to Marc Polmans and Jason Taylor.

Shinji Hazawa and Yuta Shimizu won the title after defeating Andrew Harris and John-Patrick Smith 6–4, 6–4 in the final.

Seeds

Draw

References

External links
 Main draw

Kobe Challenger - Doubles
2022 Doubles